A shackle code is a cryptographic system used in radio communications on the battle field by the US military and the Rhodesian Army.
It is specialized for the transmission of numerals.
Each of the letters of the English alphabet were assigned a numeric value.
A number could have several letters assigned.
The assignation was changed frequently and required the distribution of the codes to each party in advance.
When a party wanted to communicate a number, it radioed "SHACKLE" and it spelled out each digit (or combination of digits) using a word starting with the letter.
The end of the number was marked by the word "UNSHACKLE".

Alternatives
During World War II, the shackle codes took time to encode and decode, so during battle, sometimes troops radioed English plaintext with profanity.
Navajo code talkers were also used as an alternative.

See also
 One-time pad
 Trench code

References
  

Classical ciphers
Numerals
Radio communications